Prey Veng is a municipality (krong) located in Prey Veng province, in south eastern Cambodia. The provincial capital Prey Veng town is located in the district.

Administration

References 

Districts of Prey Veng province
Prey Veng province